Delhi Junction railway station is the oldest railway station in Old Delhi, Delhi, India. It is one of the busiest railway stations in India in terms of frequency. Around 250 trains start, end, or pass through the station daily. Its present building was constructed by the British Indian government in the style of the nearby Red Fort and opened in 1903. Chandni Chowk station of the Delhi Metro is located near it.

History

The station started with a broad gauge train from Calcutta in 1864. Metre-gauge track from Delhi to Rewari and further to Ajmer was laid in 1873 by Rajputana State Railway and metre-gauge trains from this station started in 1876.

The present building of the station was built in 1900 and opened for the public in 1903. Started with just 2 platforms and 1000 passengers, Delhi railway station now handles more than 180,000 passengers and around 190 trains starts, ends, or passes through the station daily.

In 1904 the Agra–Delhi line was opened. Delhi then was a part of six railway systems. East Indian Railway, North-Western Railway, and Oudh and Rohilkhand Railway entered from  crossing the Yamuna river.

Old Delhi railway station was built in red stone to give the effect of nearby historic Red Fort. The station building had six clock towers and tower 4 is still in use as a water tank.

Agra–Delhi railway track cut through the site earmarked for the hexagonal War Memorial (now called India Gate) and Kingsway (now called Rajpath). East Indian Railway Company shifted the line along the Yamuna river and opened the new track in 1924.

The station was remodelled in 1934–35, when its platforms were extended and power signals were introduced.  A new entrance from Kashmere Gate side was created in 1990s and new platforms were added. The platforms were renumbered in September 2011. The numbers that started from Kashmere Gate entrance as 1A and ended at 18 near the main entrance were renumbered starting as 1 from the main entrance and ending at 16 at Kashmere Gate entrance and some platforms were merged to form long platforms to accommodate trains of 24 coaches. The station building is being renovated in 2012–13.

Delhi earlier handled both broad and meter gauge trains. Since 1994, it is a purely broad-gauge station, meter gauge traffic having been shifted to Delhi Sarai Rohilla Station.

In 2016, Vivaan Solar, a Gwalior based company won the contract to install 2.2 MW of rooftop solar  project at the railway station in late 2016. The solar power project to be set up under public–private partnership will be executed on design, build, finance, operate and transfer (DBFOT) basis. The company will also be responsible for maintenance of the plant for a period of 25 years.

Junction

Railway lines from four routes connect at the Delhi Junction:

Gallery

See also

 
 
 
 Anand Vihar Terminal railway station
 Delhi Metro

References

External links

Railway junction stations in Delhi
Delhi railway division
Railway stations opened in 1864
Railway stations in North Delhi district
1864 establishments in India
Indian Railway A1 Category Stations